This is a list of British television related events from 1954.

Events

January
11 January – The first weather forecast with an in-vision presenter is televised in the United Kingdom, its first presenter is George Cowling.

February
No events.

March
No events.

April
9 April – The Grove Family, generally considered the first British TV soap opera, debuts on the BBC Television Service.

May
No events.

June
No events.

July
5 July – First actual news bulletin, News and Newsreel, aired on the BBC Television Service, replacing Television Newsreel.
30 July – The Television Act 1954 is given Royal Assent. It authorises the setting up of the infrastructure for British commercial television.

August
No events.

September
No events.

October
7 October – BBC Television covers a party political conference for the first time when it broadcasts from the Conservative Party Conference in Blackpool.

November
No events.

December
12 December – The BBC Television Service screens its famous, and controversial, adaptation of George Orwell's Nineteen Eighty-Four, which attracts criticism in the House of Commons.
30 December – The first BBC Sports Personality of the Year ceremony is presented from London's Savoy Hotel. Christopher Chataway is the first winner. The award airs annually from now on.
The British Academy Television Awards, the most prestigious awards in the British television industry, are first awarded.

Debuts

BBC Television Service
5 January – A Castle and Sixpence (1954)
16 January – The Lost Planet (1954)
19 January – Show Case (1954–1955)
27 January – Friends and Neighbours (1954)
6 February – Clementina (1954)
16 February – The Cabin in the Clearing (1954)
17 February – The Bespoke Overcoat (1954)
30 March – The Wide, Wide World (1954)
31 March –  Gravelhanger (1954)
9 April – The Grove Family (1954–1957)
21 April – Running Wild (1954)
11 May – The Windmill Family (1954)
12 May – The Dancing Bear (1954)
12 May – Fast and Loose (1954–1955)
23 May – The Promised Years (1954)
7 June – Emney Enterprises (1954–1957)
15 June – The Gentle Falcon (1954)
10 July – Happy Holidays (1954)
13 July – Dear Dotty (1954)
14 July – The Six Proud Walkers (1954)
3 August – Paradise Island (1954)
16 August – Stage by Stage (1954–1955)
25 August – Crime on Our Hands (1954)
1 October – And So to Bentley (1954)
13 November – Fabian of the Yard (1954–1956)
24 November – The Three Musketeers (1954)
12 December – Nineteen Eighty-Four (1954)
21 December – Zoo Quest (1954–1963)
24 December – Carols From Kings (1954–present)
Unknown – 
Sportsview (1954-1968)
Walk in the Air (1954–1955)

Independent productions
 The Halls of Ivy  (produced by ITC Entertainment)
 The Vise (produced by  Danziger Productions)

Continuing television shows

1920s
BBC Wimbledon (1927–1939, 1946–2019, 2021–2024)

1930s
The Boat Race (1938–1939, 1946–2019)
BBC Cricket (1939, 1946–1999, 2020–2024)

1940s
Muffin the Mule (1946–1955, 2005–2006)
Come Dancing (1949–1998)

1950s
Andy Pandy (1950–1970, 2002–2005)
Flower Pot Men (1952–1958, 2001–2002)
Watch with Mother (1952–1975)
The Appleyards (1952–1957)
All Your Own (1952–1961)
Rag, Tag and Bobtail (1953–1965)
The Good Old Days (1953–1983)
Panorama (1953–present)

Ending this year
 Television Newsreel (1948–1954)

Births
 6 January – John Sparkes, comedian
 20 February – Anthony Head, actor
 16 March – Jimmy Nail, actor and singer
 17 March – Lesley-Anne Down, actress
 28 April - Mary Jo Randle, actress
 9 May – Nicholas Crane, geographer and TV presenter
 21 June – Anne Kirkbride, actress (Deirdre Barlow in Coronation Street) (died 2015)
 16 July – Nicholas Frankau, actor
 26 August – Steve Wright, broadcaster
 27 August – Andrew Marshall, scriptwriter
 8 September – Anne Diamond, journalist and television presenter
 24 September 
Helen Lederer, comedian and actress
Martin Sixsmith, journalist, author and radio and television presenter
 3 October – Jeff Randall, journalist and television presenter
 14 October – Carole Malone, journalist and presenter
 19 October – Ken Stott, actor
 24 November – Susan Gilmore, actress (Avril Rolfe in Howards' Way)
 1 December – Alan Dedicoat, newsreader and the National Lottery's "Voice of the Balls"
 5 December – Hanif Kureishi, novelist and screenwriter
 22 December – Hugh Quarshie, actor

See also
 1954 in British music
 1954 in the United Kingdom
 List of British films of 1954

References